Doliops ligata is a species of beetle in the family Cerambycidae. It was described by Scwarz in 1929.

References

Doliops
Beetles described in 1929